Dreydlekh (plural of dreidel) or "spins" are musical ornaments  of klezmer music, particularly violin, used to produce its characteristic "tear in the voice" sound.

The main dreydlekh are glitshn (glissandos), krekhtsn ("sobs", "wails"), kneytshn ("wrinkles"),  tshoks (a kind of bent notes of cackle-like sound), and flageolets (string harmonics). 

Sometimes the term dreydlekh is used only for trills, while other use it for all Klezmer ornaments. 

Krekhts or krekhtsn (Yiddish for "sobs") are kind of dreydlekh ornamentation in klezmer music, especially on the violin. In an article about Jewish music in Romania, Bob Cohen of Di Naye Kapelye describes krekhts as "a sort of weeping or hiccoughing combination of backwards slide and flick of the little finger high above the base note, while the bow does, well, something – which aptly imitates Jewish liturgical singing style."  He also noted that the only other place he has heard this particular ornamentation is in Turkish music on the violin.

Yale Strom wrote that the use of dreydlekh by American violinists gradually diminished since 1940s, but with the klezmer revival on 1970, dreydlekh had become prominent again.

, there have been no musical methodology book teaching dreydlekhn, and they may be learned only by listening and mimicking.

References

Jewish music
Klezmer
Ornamentation